LA County Library is one of the largest public library systems in the United States which serves residents living in 49 of the 88 incorporated cities of Los Angeles County, California. LA County Library serves the surrounding regions to the city of Los Angeles, not be confused with the Los Angeles Public Library (LAPL) which serves areas within the city of Los Angeles.

History
On February 25, 1911, California enacted the County Free Library Law, by which all county governments were authorized to establish a "county free library" to serve all areas of the county where cities and towns had not already established free public libraries.  This led to the establishment of the Los Angeles County Free Library, later to become the Los Angeles County Public Library system of branches. Circa 1914, the collection was kept on the “10th floor of the Hall of Records, North Broadway and Franklin Streets.”

The library system, headquartered in Downey, California, is overseen by the Library Commission of 20 appointed members who report on administration, operation, and service to the County Board of Supervisors who operate County Library as a special fund department.

Skye Patrick was appointed County Librarian on February 1, 2016.

Partnerships and community outreach 
LA County Library initiated a partnership with the Los Angeles County Probation Department to serve systems-involved youth with an institutional library at Central Juvenile Hall. It offers collections and trained librarians to help improve literacy, teach parenting skills, and encourage respectful interactions. Programming at five Probation Juvenile Day Reporting Centers teaches life skills, builds self-confidence, and introduces potential career paths. 

LA County Library also partnered with County of Los Angeles departments to implement lived experience programs aimed at redirecting youth from engaging in at-risk behaviors. The My Brother’s Keeper Peer Advocate program hires young adults of color with lived experience as advisors and liaisons. These Peer Advocates build community relationships, develop programming, and raise awareness of Library services.

LA County Library launched three book kiosks located at County housing sites: Cedar Springs Housing in La Verne serving transition age youth, tenants with mental health disorders, and low-income families; Carmelitos in Long Beach; and Nueva Maravilla Senior Housing in East Los Angeles. The Library installed bookshelves at 10 barbershops across South Los Angeles to encourage reading for boys ages 4 – 8 to help minimize the literacy gap between young men of color and their peers.

COVID-19 response 
When LA County Library was forced to close its doors in March 2020 at the start of the COVID-19 pandemic, the Library established a Laptop & Hotspot Loan service, expanded Wi-Fi service to Library parking lots with Park & Connect, and developed virtual programs on YouTube and Webex Events for all ages and interests, such as programs about distance learning and workforce development.

Awards and accolades 
LA County Library was a finalist for the IMLS National Medal in 2018 and 2019.

LA County Library won the 2018 Marketer of the Year Award, the 2019 Librarian of the Year Award for Skye Patrick, and the 2019 Library of the Year Award. All three awards were from Library Journal, and this was the first time a single organization held all three awards at the same time.

Services and resources

The library provides many resources, including literacy services and programs for families and children.

The library system offers consumer health information under CHIPS (Consumer Health Information Program and Services).

Branches
Acton Agua Dulce Library
Agoura Hills Library
Antelope Valley BookMobile
Castaic Library
City Terrace Library
Claremont Library
Clifton M. Brakensiek Library
Compton Library
Cudahy Library
Culver City Julian Dixon Library 
Diamond Bar Library
Dr. Martin Luther King, Jr. Library
Duarte Library
East Los Angeles Library
East Rancho Dominguez Library
El Camino Real Library
El Monte Library
Florence Library
Gardena Mayme Dear Library
George Nye Jr. Library
Graham Library
Hacienda Heights Library
Hawaiian Gardens Library
Hawthorne Library
Hermosa Beach Library
Hollydale Library
Huntington Park Library
Angelo M. Iacoboni Library
La Cañada Flintridge Library
La Crescenta Library
La Mirada Library
La Puente Library
La Verne Library
Lake Los Angeles Library
Lancaster Library
Lawndale Library
Leland R. Weaver Library
Lennox Library
Littlerock Library
Live Oak Library
Lloyd Taber-Marina del Rey Library
Lomita Library
Los Nietos Library
Lynwood Library
Malibu Library
Manhattan Beach Library
Masao W. Satow Library
Maywood César Chávez Library
Montebello Library
Norwalk Library
Norwood Library
Paramount Library
Pico Rivera Library
Quartz Hill Library
Rivera Library
Rosemead Library
Rowland Heights Library
San Dimas Library
San Fernando Library
San Gabriel Library
Santa Clarita Valley Bookmobile
Sorensen Library
South El Monte Library
South Whittier Library
Stevenson Ranch Library
Sunkist Library
Temple City Library
Topanga Library
Urban Outreach Bookmobile
View Park BeBe Moore Campbell Library
Walnut Library
West Covina Library
West Hollywood Library
Westlake Village Library
Willowbrook Library
Wiseburn Library
Woodcrest Library

References

Further reading
 Woelfel, Roger H. (1987). Diamond Jubilee: Seventy-Five Years of Public Service. Glendale, CA: Arthur C. Clark Company.

External links

 County of Los Angeles Library system

Los Angeles
 
Los Angeles County Library
Library